Strings & Trombones  is an album by Bud Shank, featuring Bob Brookmeyer, which was recorded in 1954 and 1955 for the Pacific Jazz label. The album compiles Shank's earlier 10-inch LPs Bud Shank and Bob Brookmeyer and Bud Shank and Three Trombones.

Reception

Allmusic rated the album with three stars.

Track listing
 "Low Life" (Johnny Mandel) - 3:56
 "With the Wind and the Rain in Your Hair" (Jack Lawrence, Clara Edwards) - 5:07
 "You Are Too Beautiful" (Richard Rodgers, Lorenz Hart) - 3:59
 "When Your Lover Has Gone" (Einar Aaron Swan) - 2:56
 "Rustic Hop" (Bob Brookmeyer) - 4:13
 "Wailing Vessel" (Bob Cooper) - 2:41
 "Cool Fool" (Cooper) - 3:18
 "Little Girl Blue" (Rodgers, Hart) - 3:16
 "Sing Something Simple" (Herman Hupfield) - 2:35
 "You Don't Know What Love Is" (Don Raye, Gene de Paul) - 4:16
 "Valve in Head" (Bud Shank) - 3:10

Personnel 
Bud Shank - alto saxophone
Bob Brookmeyer (tracks 1-5), Bob Enevoldsen (tracks 6-11), Maynard Ferguson (tracks 6-11), Stu Williamson (tracks 6-11) - valve trombone
Claude Williamson - piano
Buddy Clark (tracks 1, 2 & 5), Joe Mondragon (tracks 3, 4 & 6-11) - bass
Larry Bunker (tracks 1-5), Shelly Manne (tracks 6-11) - drums
String section arranged by Bob Cooper (tracks 6-11)

References 

1956 albums
Pacific Jazz Records albums
Bud Shank albums
Bob Brookmeyer albums